Cieplice may refer to the following places in Poland:
Cieplice, Lesser Poland Voivodeship (south Poland)
Cieplice, Subcarpathian Voivodeship (south-east Poland)
Cieplice, Warmian-Masurian Voivodeship (north Poland)
, a former town, now a district of Jelenia Góra